Davide Saitta (born 23 June 1987) is an Italian male volleyball player. With his club Al-Arabi he competed at the 2011 FIVB Volleyball Men's Club World Championship.

References

External links
 Davide Saitta at the International Volleyball Federation
 

1987 births
Living people
Italian men's volleyball players
Place of birth missing (living people)
Mediterranean Games medalists in volleyball
Mediterranean Games gold medalists for Italy
Competitors at the 2009 Mediterranean Games